Hans-Peter Friedländer (6 November 1920 – July 1999) immigrated with his family to Switzerland at the age of five years. He was active as a Swiss football forward who played for Switzerland in the 1950 FIFA World Cup. He also played for Grasshopper Club Zürich and FC Lausanne-Sport.

References

1920 births
1999 deaths
Swiss men's footballers
Jewish footballers
Switzerland international footballers
Association football forwards
Grasshopper Club Zürich players
FC Lausanne-Sport players
1950 FIFA World Cup players
German emigrants to Switzerland